Pharmakoi/Distance-Crunching Honchos with Echo Units is the only album by the Australian alternative rock band The Refo:mation, released in 1997.

The Refo:mation was a de facto reunion of the Australian psychedelic rock band The Church with their original guitarist Peter Koppes, but without other guitarist Marty Willson-Piper.

Koppes had left the band in 1992 but had played as a guest on their 1996 album Magician Among the Spirits. Following that album's commercial failure however, the members of The Church had turned their attention to other projects and Willson-Piper had left Australia in order to collaborate with other artists and write new solo material.

In his absence, singer/bassist Steve Kilbey, drummer Tim Powles and the returning Koppes spent some studio time together and quickly wrote and recorded an album. Loose in feel, but rich in atmosphere, the eccentrically-titled Pharmakoi/Distance-Crunching Honchos With Echo Units saw a greater focus on concise, guitar-dominated songs, in contrast to the experimentation of Magician Among the Spirits.

The trio had initially thought of calling themselves "The Reformation", but this was altered, on Powles' suggestion, as a courtesy to the absent Willson-Piper.

Track listing
All songs by The Refo:mation

"1:07"  – 1:08
"Don't Move"  – 4:21
"Traitor"  – 5:21
"She Comes In Singing"  – 3:39
"All See It Now"  – 4:42
"Trying to Get In"  – 5:38
"Florian Trout"  – 4:35
"5:28"  – 3:29
"Who Is the One?"  – 5:34
"Get Over It"  – 3:45
"Take Your Place"  – 3:46
"Towards Sleep"  – 5:22
"The Moon and the Sea"  – 4:56
"Stop"  – 4:51

Personnel 

Steve Kilbey – lead vocals, bass guitar, keyboards, guitar
Peter Koppes – guitars, keyboards, bass guitar
Tim Powles – drums, percussion, bass guitar, lead vocal on "Take Your Place"
with
Sandy Chick – vocals
Chris Campbell – guitar on "5:28"

Recorded at Karmic Hit Studios, Rozelle, Sydney, Australia
Engineered & mixed by Tim Powles
Assistant Engineer Chris Campbell
Album artwork by Julien Klettenberg

1997 albums
The Church (band) albums